"Buzzkill(er)" is a single by the Dead Weather from their third studio album, Dodge and Burn. A short clip of the song was originally posted in July 2014, as part of Third Man Records' Vault subscription series. A full version of the song was released digitally on November 4, 2014, along with another Dead Weather song, "It's Just Too Bad".  An extended excerpt of the song was used by Turner Classic Movies to promote its January 2017 broadcast schedule.

Personnel
 Alison Mosshart – vocals
 Dean Fertita – synthesizer, guitar
 Jack Lawrence – bass
 Jack White – drums, percussion

Critical reception
Michelle Geslani described it as "a searing, punchy rocker equipped with enough buzzsaw-like riffs to shred eardrums and speakers alike." Rachel Brodsky said that the song "blasts off hard with a series of bass drum beats and high-pitched guitar squeals".

References

The Dead Weather songs
2014 singles
2014 songs
Songs written by Alison Mosshart
Songs written by Dean Fertita